College Hill High School is a public alternative high school in Corvallis, Oregon, United States.

College Hill High School is housed in the historic Harding School building, a Colonial Revival style school building. The oldest portion of the building was built in 1923 with the name College Hill School.

References

Alternative schools in Oregon
Buildings and structures in Corvallis, Oregon
High schools in Benton County, Oregon
Public high schools in Oregon
Education in Corvallis, Oregon
Historic district contributing properties in Oregon
National Register of Historic Places in Benton County, Oregon
School buildings on the National Register of Historic Places in Oregon